Picture Imperfect is the debut album by Canadian singer and songwriter Shiloh released on Universal Music Canada. It was released on August 18, 2009, in Canada. Picture Imperfect debuted and peaked at number nine on the Canadian Albums Chart.

Singles
"Operator (A Girl Like Me)" debuted on Family Channel during their "Stand Up Against Bullying" week in late 2008, it has since been played many times on Family Channel, on FamJam. It has been viewed over 2 million times on Shiloh's official YouTube channel.

"Goodbye, You Suck" is the second single for the album. The music video was released in early 2009 and has made it to the top 5 on the MuchMusic Countdown.

The third single, "Alright", made its YouTube debut on June 17, 2009.

Shiloh was a special guest performer in one of YTV's The Next Star episodes.

Critical reception

AllMusic's Jason Birchmeier praised the various genre styles heard throughout the album and being reminiscent of an up-and-coming Pink, concluding that "At only 16 years of age, Shiloh has plenty of time to develop not only her songwriting but also her persona, and it will be interesting to see what comes of her in the future, for she definitely has the makings of a punk-pop superstar. In any event, she's off to a promising start with Picture Imperfect, a likable album with lots of hit material."

Track listing

Personnel
 Mike Fraser – mixing (The Warehouse, Vancouver)
 Tom Coyne – mastering (Sterling Sound, NYC)
 Garnet Armstrong – art direction/design, Illustrations
 Simon Paul – illustrations
 Ivan Otis – photography

Charts

References

2009 debut albums
Universal Music Canada albums